James V. Infantino is a retired politician in Montreal, Quebec, Canada. He was a member of the Montréal-Nord city council from 1994 to 2001 and a member of the Montreal city council from 2001 to 2009.

Montréal-Nord city councillor
Infantino ran in the 1994 Montréal-Nord municipal election as a candidate of mayor Yves Ryan's Renouveau municipal and was elected without difficulty. A vocal supporter of the mayor, he was re-elected in 1998.

Montreal city councillor
All of the municipalities on the Island of Montreal, including Montréal-Nord, were amalgamated into a single city on January 1, 2002. Infantino was narrowly elected to one of Montréal-Nord's three city council seats in the anticipatory 2001 Montreal municipal election as a candidate of Gérald Tremblay's Montreal Island Citizens Union (MICU). Tremblay won the mayoral election and his party won a majority of seats on council, and Infantino served as a supporter of Tremblay's administration. He was appointed to the Montreal Metropolitan Community in 2002, and by virtue of holding his city council seat he automatically served on the newly created Montréal-Nord borough council.

In 2004, Infantino argued that amalgamation had benefited Montréal-Nord by ensuring that road repairs would be covered by the city's central budget. The following year, he supported an extension of Quebec Autoroute 25 to Laval, which he said would improve pedestrian safety in his borough.

Infantino was re-elected in the 2005 municipal election, in which MICU won a second consecutive majority. He supported a controversial proposal to rename Montreal's Park Avenue after former Quebec premier Robert Bourassa in 2006; on the night of the vote, he was quoted as saying, "I think it's a one-for-one change. Park Ave. was great. Robert Bourassa was great."

He did not seek re-election in 2009.

Electoral record

References

Living people
Montreal city councillors
People from Montréal-Nord
Year of birth missing (living people)